The Royal Saxon State Railway designated four-coupled tank locomotives for passenger train service as class IV T (four-T), and the Deutsche Reichsbahn subsequently grouped these locomotives into DRG Class 71.3 in 1925.

History 
In terms of design, the locomotives were based on the class T 5.1 of the Prussian State Railways. Despite the defects that emerged, such as the uneven running at high speed, which led to derailments, 91 copies of this locomotive were procured from 1897 to 1909 in several lots. On Saxon routes it is not so much a high top speed that matters, but rather good acceleration due to the relatively short distance between the stops.

The first locomotives were named after small towns in Saxony  and were listed as VIII bb T; in 1900 the designation was changed to IV T.

Locomotive 1727 was the leading locomotive in the serious  between Braunsdorf and Frankenberg on the Roßwein–Niederwiesa railway line on 14 December 1913. The lead locomotive was repaired – hard to believe, if you look at the accident – but not until 1933 when it became DRG 71 322. 

The Deutsche Reichsbahn took over 85 locomotives of this type and gave them the numbers 71 301 to 71 385. Six locomotives were taken out of service shortly before the re-designation; another wave of retirement followed around 1930. After World War II, two locomotives remained with ČSD, while ten locomotives came to the Deutsche Reichsbahn. The locomotives were retired by the Deutsche Reichsbahn by 1955; none of them survived.

Technical features 
The connecting rod drove the second axle via Heusinger (Walschaerts) valve gear. The driving wheels were of  diameter.

The two carrying axles were designed as Adam axles.

In the last series, cutouts were also left in the firebox area.

In addition to handbrake, the Westinghouse brake, which acted on both sets of coupling wheels, was available. The air pump required for this was arranged on the right-hand side of the smokebox.

All previously delivered machines were later retrofitted in this way.

The first delivery series had a driver's cab with a large door cutout; from 1902, the locomotives were instead equipped with sliding windows on the side. The ventilation attachment on the driver's cab roof was subsequently supplemented by four ventilation hoods.

References 

 
 
 

2-4-2T locomotives
Sächsische Maschinenfabrik locomotives
04 T
Railway locomotives introduced in 1897
Standard gauge locomotives of Germany
1′B1′ n2t locomotives
Passenger locomotives